Pierangelo Pira (born 4 January 1954) is an Italian boxer. He competed in the men's light middleweight event at the 1976 Summer Olympics.

References

1954 births
Living people
Italian male boxers
Olympic boxers of Italy
Boxers at the 1976 Summer Olympics
Sportspeople from Rimini
Light-middleweight boxers
20th-century Italian people